The National Jewish Welfare Board (JWB) was formed on April 9, 1917, three days after the United States declared war on Germany, in order to support Jewish soldiers in the U.S. military during World War I.  The impetus for creating the organization stemmed from Secretary of War, Newton Baker and Secretary of Navy, Josephus Daniels.  The organization was also charged with recruiting and training rabbis for military service, as well as providing support materials to these newly commissioned chaplains. The JWB also maintained oversight of Jewish chapel facilities at military installations.

In 1921, several organizations merged with the JWB to become a national association of Jewish community centers around the country in order to integrate social activities, education, and active recreation.  These merged organizations included the YWHA, YMHA, and the National Council of Young Men's Hebrew and Kindred Association. 
 
In 1941, the United Service Organizations  for National Defense was brought into existence through Presidential order February 4. The USO was incorporated in New York state as a private, nonprofit organization, supported by private citizens and corporations. President Franklin D. Roosevelt wanted the morale of military personnel to remain high and believed that current service organizations would be better suited for the job than the Department of Defense. The six private organizations were - the National Catholic Community Service (NCCS),Young Men's Christian Association YMCA, Young Women's Christian Association YWCA, the National Jewish Welfare Board, the Traveler's Aid Association and the Salvation Army. These organizations were challenged to handle the on-leave morale and recreational needs for members of the Armed Forces.  The six organizations pooled their resources and the United Service Organizations, which quickly became known as the USO, was incorporated in New York on February 4, 1941.

The organization is now the JWB Jewish Chaplains Council, part of JCC of North America. The Council sends religious artifacts and supplies for Jewish holidays, including Passover Seder kits, Hanukkah candles, four species for Tabernacles, and more.

Related links

National Jewish Welfare Board Records; I-337; American Jewish Historical Society, Boston, MA and New York, NY. 
National Jewish Welfare Board Records; I-298; American Jewish Historical Society, Boston, MA and New York, NY. 
National Jewish Welfare Board Military Chaplaincy Records; I-249; American Jewish Historical Society, Boston, MA and New York, NY.
National Jewish Welfare Board, Army-Navy Division Records; I-180; American Jewish Historical Society, Boston, MA and New York, NY.
National Jewish Welfare Board, Bureau of War Records; I-52; American Jewish Historical Society, Boston, MA and New York, NY.

References

External links
JWB Jewish Chaplains Council

Jewish organizations based in the United States
Jewish-American history
Jewish-American military history
Religious organizations established in 1917
1917 establishments in the United States